25P or 25p may refer to:
25P Microwave Systems Operator/Maintainer
British twenty-five pence coin
 Phosphorus-25 (25P), an isotope of phosphorus

See also
P25 (disambiguation)
Frame rate
Pence